Homoranthus decasetus is a plant in the myrtle family Myrtaceae and is endemic to a small area in central Queensland. It has small, thin leaves and flowers that fade to purple as they age.

Description
The flower are arranged singly on short branchlets in leaf axils. The calyx tube is urn-shaped, with five ribs on the outside. As the flowers age they turn from white to red or purple. The fruit is about the same size as the flower and contains a single winged seed. Flowering and fruiting occur sporadically throughout the year.

Taxonomy and naming
Homoranthus decasetus was first formally described in 1981 by Norman Byrnes from a specimen collected in Isla Gorge in 1977 and the description was published in Austrobaileya. This species of Homoranthus has ten bristles on the tips of the calyx.

Distribution and habitat
Restricted to area between Rolleston, Theodore and Taroom in central Queensland. Grows usually in rocky woodland on shallow sandy soils.

Conservation status
An uncommon species but well reserved in several national parks.  ROTAP conservation code of 3RCa using Briggs and Leigh (1996)

References

External links
 The Australasian Virtual Herbarium – Occurrence data for Homoranthus decasetus

Flora of Queensland
Myrtales of Australia
decasetus
Plants described in 1981
Taxa named by Norman Brice Byrnes